Asian Sound Radio is a radio station located in Broadcast House, Southall Street in Manchester. It is the only 24-hour commercial radio station in the North West dedicated to the Asian community, broadcasting on MW across the whole region from Preston in the North to Stockport in the South. The programming is a blend of news, current affairs, interviews, competitions, music and information in English, Urdu, Punjabi, Pashto Bengali and Gujarati.

References

External links

Radio stations established in 1996
Radio stations in Manchester
Asian mass media in the United Kingdom
British Indian mass media
British Pakistani mass media
British Bangladeshi mass media